Frederick Mann (1869–1958) was chief justice of Victoria, Australia 

Frederick Mann may also refer to:
 Frederick Mann (USCG) the namesake of a Sentinel class cutter
 USCGC Frederick Mann a Sentinel class cutter